Mariam Mirza is a Pakistani television actress, beautician and former banker. She is known for her role as Nasreen (Zubia's mother) in Khamoshi which ranked among the highest rated Urdu drama serials of 2017. She is also known for her role as Safeeha in ARY Digital's family drama Aangan.

Career 
She was a salon owner before getting into acting and sold off her salon when she joined the industry.

Filmography

Television

Telefilms

References

External links

Living people
People from Karachi
1979 births